Frankenstein is a 1931 American pre-Code science fiction horror film directed by James Whale, produced by Carl Laemmle Jr., and adapted from a 1927 play by Peggy Webling, which in turn was based on Mary Shelley's 1818 novel Frankenstein; or, The Modern Prometheus. The Webling play was adapted by John L. Balderston and the screenplay written by Francis Edward Faragoh and Garrett Fort, with uncredited contributions from Robert Florey and John Russell.

Frankenstein stars Colin Clive as Henry Frankenstein (Victor Frankenstein in the novel), an obsessed scientist who digs up corpses with his assistant in order to assemble a living being from body parts. The resulting creature, often known as Frankenstein's monster, is portrayed by Boris Karloff. The make-up for the monster was provided by Jack Pierce. Alongside Clive and Karloff, the film's cast also includes Mae Clarke, John Boles, Dwight Frye, and Edward Van Sloan.

Produced and distributed by Universal Pictures, the film was a commercial success upon release, and was generally well received by both critics and audiences. It spawned a number of sequels and spin-offs, and has had a significant impact on popular culture: the imagery of a  maniacal "mad" scientist with a subservient hunchbacked assistant and the film's depiction of Frankenstein's monster have since become iconic. In 1991, the United States Library of Congress selected Frankenstein for preservation in the National Film Registry as being "culturally, historically, or aesthetically significant".

Plot

In a village of the Bavarian Alps, Henry Frankenstein and his assistant Fritz, a hunchback, piece together a human body. Some of the parts are from freshly buried bodies, and some from the bodies of recently hanged criminals. In a laboratory he's built inside a watchtower, Henry desires to create a human, giving this body life through electrical devices. He still needs a brain for his creation. At a nearby school, Henry's former teacher Dr. Waldman shows his class the brain of an average human being and the corrupted brain of a criminal for comparison. Henry sends Fritz to steal the healthy brain from Waldman's class. Fritz accidentally damages it, and so brings Henry the corrupt brain.

Henry's fiancée Elizabeth speaks with their friend Victor about the scientist's peculiar actions and his seclusion. Elizabeth and Victor ask Waldman for help understanding Henry's behavior, and Waldman reveals he is aware Henry wishes to create life. Concerned for Henry, they arrive at the lab just as he makes his final preparations, the lifeless body on an operating table. As a storm rages, Henry invites Elizabeth and the others to watch. Henry and Fritz raise the operating table toward an opening at the top of the tower. The creature and Henry's equipment are exposed to the lightning storm and empowered, bringing the creature to life.

Frankenstein's Monster, despite its grotesque form, seems to be an innocent, childlike creation. Henry welcomes it into his laboratory and asks it to sit, which it does. He opens up the roof, causing the Monster to reach out towards the sunlight. Fritz enters with a flaming torch, which frightens the Monster. Its fright is mistaken by Henry and Waldman for an attempt to attack them, and it is chained in the dungeon, where Fritz antagonizes it with a torch. Hearing Fritz screaming in the dungeon, Henry and Waldman run down, finding that the Monster has forcefully hanged Fritz. The Monster lunges at the two but they lock the Monster inside. Realizing the Monster must be destroyed, Henry prepares an injection of a powerful drug and the two conspire to release the Monster and inject it as it attacks. When the door is unlocked the Monster lunges at Henry as Waldman injects the drug into the Monster's back. The Monster falls to the floor unconscious.

Henry collapses from exhaustion, and Elizabeth and Henry's father take him home. Henry is worried about the Monster, but Waldman reassures him that he will destroy it. While Henry is at home, recovered and preparing for his wedding, Waldman examines the Monster. As he prepares to vivisect it, the Monster strangles him. It escapes from the tower and wanders through the landscape, encountering a farmer's young daughter, Maria. She asks him to play a game with her in which they toss flowers onto a lake. The Monster enjoys the game, but when the monster runs out of stock, thinking that Maria is one of the flowers to count, he throws her into the lake, where she drowns beneath the surface. The Monster runs away.

With preparations for the wedding completed, Henry is happy with Elizabeth. They are to marry as soon as Waldman arrives. Victor rushes in, saying that Waldman has been found strangled. Henry suspects the Monster. The Monster enters Elizabeth's room, causing her to scream. When the searchers arrive, they find Elizabeth in shock, then unconscious. The Monster has escaped.

Maria's father arrives, carrying his drowned daughter's body. He says she was murdered, and the villagers form a lynch mob to capture the Monster. During the search, Henry is attacked by the Monster. The Monster knocks Henry unconscious and carries him to an old windmill. The peasants hear the creature carrying Henry and find it climbing to the top, dragging Henry with it. The Monster hurls the scientist to the ground. His fall is broken by the wooden blades of the windmill, saving his life. Some of the villagers bring him home while the rest of the mob set the windmill ablaze, with the Monster trapped inside with nowhere to escape.

At Castle Frankenstein, Henry's father celebrates the wedding of his recovered son with a toast to a future grandchild.

Cast

 Colin Clive as Henry Frankenstein.
 Mae Clarke as Elizabeth Lavenza, Henry's fiancée.
 John Boles as Victor Moritz, Henry's friend.
 Boris Karloff as The Monster.
 Edward Van Sloan as Dr. Waldman.
 Frederick Kerr as Baron Frankenstein.
 Dwight Frye as Fritz, Henry's assistant.
 Lionel Belmore as Herr Vogel.
 Marilyn Harris as Little Maria, a little girl.
 Michael Mark as Ludwig, Maria's father.

Production

In 1930, Universal Studios had lost $2.2 million in revenues. Within 48 hours of its opening at New York's Roxy Theatre on February 12, 1931, Dracula starring Bela Lugosi had sold 50,000 tickets, building a momentum that culminated in a $700,000 profit, the largest of Universal's 1931 releases. As a result, the head of production, Carl Laemmle Jr., announced immediate plans for more horror films. It purchased the film rights to John L. Balderston's planned stage adaptation of Peggy Webling's British stage adaptation of Mary Wollstonecraft Shelley's original novel.

Immediately following his success in Dracula, Lugosi had hoped to play Henry Frankenstein in Universal's original film concept. However, the actor was expected by producer Carl Laemmle Jr. to play the Monster (a common move for a contract player in a film studio at the time) to keep his famous name on the bill.

Although this is often regarded as one of the worst decisions in any actor's career, in actuality, the part that Lugosi was offered was not the same character that Karloff eventually played. The initial director was Robert Florey, who had re-characterized the Monster as a simple killing machine, without a touch of human interest or pathos, unlike in the original Shelley novel. This reportedly caused Lugosi to complain, "I was a star in my country and I will not be a scarecrow over here!" Florey later wrote that "the Hungarian actor didn't show himself very enthusiastic for the role and didn't want to play it". However, the decision may not have been Lugosi's in any case, since recent evidence suggests that he was kicked off the project, along with director Robert Florey, when the newly arrived James Whale asked for the property and later cast Karloff, who resembled Whale.
 
Actors who worked on the project either were, or shortly became familiar to the fans of the Universal horror films. These included Frederick Kerr as the old Baron Frankenstein, Henry's father; Lionel Belmore as Herr Vogel, the Bürgermeister; Marilyn Harris as Little Maria, the girl the Monster accidentally kills; Dwight Frye as Frankenstein's hunchbacked assistant, Fritz; and Michael Mark as Ludwig, Maria's father.

Kenneth Strickfaden designed the electrical effects that were used in the "creation scene". They were so successful that such effects came to be considered an essential part of every subsequent Universal film involving Frankenstein's Monster. Accordingly, the equipment used to produce them has come to be referred to in fan circles as "Strickfadens". It appears that Strickfaden managed to secure the use of at least one Tesla Coil built by the inventor Nikola Tesla himself.

The film opened in New York City at the Mayfair Theatre on December 4, 1931, and grossed $53,000 in one week.

Florey and Lugosi were given the Murders in the Rue Morgue film, as a consolation. Lugosi would later go on to play Frankenstein's Monster in Frankenstein Meets the Wolf Man a decade later, when his career was in decline (in the original shooting script the Monster spoke, cancelling Lugosi's initial objection to the part, but his filmed dialogue sequences were cut prior to release, along with the premise that the Monster was blind, which was the way Lugosi had played it).

Pre-Code era scenes and censorship history

The scene in which the Monster throws the little girl, Maria, into the lake and accidentally drowns her has long been controversial. Upon its original 1931 release, the second part of this scene was cut by state censorship boards in Massachusetts, Pennsylvania, and New York. Those states also objected to a line they considered blasphemous that occurred during Frankenstein's exuberance when he first learns that his creature is alive. The original relevant passage was:
VICTOR: "Henry, in the name of God!"
HENRY: "In the name of God? Now I know what it feels like to BE God!"
Kansas requested the cutting of 32 scenes, which, if they had been removed, would have cut a literal half of the film. Jason Joy of the Studio Relations Committee sent censor representative Joseph Breen to urge them to reconsider. Eventually, an edited version was released in Kansas.

As with many Pre-Code films that were reissued after strict enforcement of the Production Code in 1934, Universal made cuts from the original camera negative, and thus the cut footage is often lost. However, the footage of the girl Maria being thrown into the lake was rediscovered during the 1980s in the collection of the British National Film Archive, and it has been reincorporated into modern copies of the film.

In the Irish Free State, the film was banned on February 5, 1932, for being demoralizing and unsuitable for children or "nervous people" – age-restricted certificates were not introduced in the country until 1965. The decision was overturned by the Appeal Board on March 8, and the film was passed uncut on March 9. The film was successfully banned in Northern Ireland, Quebec, Sweden, Italy, and Czechoslovakia.

Reception

The New York Times film critic Mordaunt Hall gave Frankenstein a very positive review. He said that the film "aroused so much excitement at the Mayfair yesterday that many in the audience laughed to cover their true feelings. [T]here is no denying that it is far and away the most effective thing of its kind. Beside it Dracula is tame and, incidentally, Dracula was produced by the same firm".

Film Daily also lauded the picture, calling it a "gruesome, chill-producing and exciting drama" that was "produced intelligently and lavishly and with a grade of photography that is superb".

Variety reported that it "looks like a Dracula plus, touching a new peak in horror plays", and described Karloff's performance as "a fascinating acting bit of mesmerism". Its review also singled out the look of the film as uniquely praiseworthy, calling the photography "splendid" and the lighting "the last word in ingenuity, since much of the footage calls for dim or night effect and the manipulation of shadows to intensify the ghostly atmosphere".

John Mosher of The New Yorker was less enthused, calling the film only a "moderate success" and writing that "the makeup department has a triumph to its credit in the monster and there lie the thrills of the picture, but the general fantasy lacks the vitality which that little Mrs. P.B. Shelley was able to give her book".

The film was banned in China due to falling under the category of "superstitious films" as a result of its "strangeness" and unscientific elements.

Frankenstein has continued to receive acclaim from critics and is widely regarded as one of the best films of 1931, as well as one of the greatest movies of all time.  

In 1991, the film was selected for preservation in the United States National Film Registry as being deemed "culturally, historically or aesthetically significant". In 2004, The New York Times placed the film on its Best 1000 Movies Ever list.

Frankenstein also received recognition from the American Film Institute. It was named the 87th greatest movie of all time on 100 Years... 100 Movies. The line "It's alive! It's alive!" was ranked as the 49th greatest movie quote in American cinema. The film was on the ballot for several of AFI's 100 series lists, including AFI's 10 Top 10 for the sci-fi category, 100 Years... 100 Movies (10th Anniversary Edition), and twice on 100 Years... 100 Heroes and Villains for both Henry Frankenstein and the Monster in the villains category.

The film was ranked number 56 on AFI's 100 Years... 100 Thrills, a list of America's most heart-pounding movies. It was also ranked number 27 on Bravo's 100 Scariest Movie Moments. Additionally, the Chicago Film Critics Association named it the 14th scariest film ever made.

Box office
The film was a commercial success. In June 1932, the film had earned reported rentals of $1.4 million. In 1943, Universal reported it had earned a profit of $708,871. By 1953, all the Frankenstein re-releases earned an estimated profit of $12 million.

Home media
In 1986, MCA Home Video released Frankenstein on LaserDisc. This release restored all the cut footage, as well as most of Frankenstein's "In the name of God!" line. In the 1990s, MCA/Universal Home Video released the film on VHS as part of the "Universal Monsters Classic Collection", a series of releases of Universal Classic Monsters films.

In 1999, Universal released Frankenstein on VHS and DVD as part of the "Classic Monster Collection"; this release restored the rest of the censored material. In April 2004, Universal released Frankenstein: The Legacy Collection on DVD as part of the "Universal Legacy Collection". This two-disc release includes Frankenstein, Bride of Frankenstein, Son of Frankenstein, The Ghost of Frankenstein and The House of Frankenstein. In September 2006, Universal released Frankenstein on DVD as a two-disc "75th Anniversary Edition", as part of the "Universal Legacy Series".

In 2012, Frankenstein was released on Blu-ray as part of the Universal Classic Monsters: The Essential Collection box set, which also includes a total of nine films from the Universal Classic Monsters series. In September 2013, Frankenstein received a standalone Blu-ray release. That same year, Frankenstein was included as part of the six-film Blu-ray set Universal Classic Monsters Collection, which also includes Dracula, The Mummy, The Invisible Man, Bride of Frankenstein, and The Wolf Man. The next year, Universal released Frankenstein: Complete Legacy Collection on DVD. This set contains eight films: Frankenstein, Bride of Frankenstein, Son of Frankenstein, Ghost of Frankenstein, Frankenstein Meets the Wolf Man, The House of Frankenstein, House of Dracula, and Abbott and Costello Meet Frankenstein. In 2015, the six-film Universal Classic Monsters Collection was released on DVD. In 2016, Frankenstein received a Walmart-exclusive Blu-ray release featuring a glow-in-the-dark cover. That same year, the Complete Legacy Collection was released on Blu-ray. In September 2017, the film received a Best Buy-exclusive steelbook Blu-ray release with cover artwork by Alex Ross.

Frankenstein and its sequels were included in the Universal Classic Monsters: Complete 30-Film Collection Blu-ray box set in August 2018. This box set also received a DVD release. Later in October, Frankenstein was included as part of a limited edition Best Buy-exclusive Blu-ray set titled Universal Classic Monsters: The Essential Collection, which features artwork by Alex Ross. Universal Pictures Home Entertainment released the film on 4K Ultra HD Blu-ray on October 5, 2021.

Sequels

Frankenstein was followed by a string of sequels, beginning with Bride of Frankenstein (1935), in which Elsa Lanchester plays the Monster's bride.

The next sequel, Son of Frankenstein (1939), was made, like all those that followed, without Whale or Clive (the latter of whom had died in 1937). This film featured Karloff's last full film performance as the Monster. Son of Frankenstein presented Basil Rathbone as Baron Wolf von Frankenstein, Bela Lugosi as bearded hunchback Ygor, and Lionel Atwill as Inspector Krogh.

The Ghost of Frankenstein was released in 1942. The film features Lon Chaney Jr. as the Monster, taking over from Boris Karloff, who played the role in the first three films of the series, and Bela Lugosi in his second appearance as the demented Ygor.

The fifth installment, Frankenstein Meets the Wolf Man was released in 1943, directed by Roy William Neill and starring Bela Lugosi as Frankenstein's monster. This is also the sequel to The Wolf Man, with Lon Chaney Jr. returning as the Wolf Man.

In the follow-up, House of Frankenstein (1944), Karloff returned to the series, but not to reprise his role as the monster, but as the Mad Doctor; the monster was this time portrayed by Glenn Strange. Chaney Jr. returned as the Wolf Man. Dracula was also featured in the film, played by John Carradine.

Its sequel, House of Dracula (1945), featured the same three monsters, Dracula, Frankenstein's monster and the Wolf Man with the same cast in their portrayals.

Many of the subsequent films which featured Frankenstein's monster demote the creature to a robotic henchman in someone else's plots, such as in its final Universal film appearance in the deliberately farcical Abbott and Costello Meet Frankenstein (1948) as well as the aforementioned House of Frankenstein and House of Dracula.

Other adaptations

 Karloff would return to the wearing of the makeup and to the role of the monster one last time in a 1962 episode of the television show  Route 66.
 The popular 1960s television sitcom, The Munsters, depicts the family's father Herman as Frankenstein's monster, who married Count Dracula's daughter. The make-up for Herman is based on the make-up of Boris Karloff.
 Frankenstein appears in Mad Monster Party? (1967), a Rankin/Bass Productions Halloween special, where Dr. Boris von Frankenstein (voiced by Karloff) invites various classic monsters to a reunion at his castle with intentions to announce his retirement and to name his successor.
 Mel Brooks's comedy Young Frankenstein (1974) parodied elements of the first three Universal Frankenstein films, while also using the original props built for the 1935 film, provided by their designer Kenneth Strickfaden. Brooks also recreated the movie into a 2007 Broadway musical of the same name.
 A live-action parody short film, Frankenweenie (1984), depicting Victor Frankenstein as a modern American boy and his deceased pet dog as the monster, was made by Tim Burton in 1984. Burton remade it as a full-length animated film in 2012.

Frankenstein's assistant
Although Frankenstein's hunchbacked assistant is often referred to as "Igor" in descriptions of the films, he is not so called in the earliest films. In both Frankenstein and Bride of Frankenstein, Frankenstein has an assistant, who is played both times by Dwight Frye, who is disabled. In the original 1931 film the character is named "Fritz"; he is hunchbacked and walks with the aid of a small cane. Fritz did not originate from the Frankenstein novel, and instead originated from the earliest recorded play adaptation, Presumption; or, the Fate of Frankenstein, where he was played by Robert Keeley.

In Bride of Frankenstein, Frye plays "Karl", a murderer who stands upright but has a lumbering metal brace on both legs that can be heard clicking loudly with every step. Both characters would be killed by Karloff's monster in their respective films. Frye also appears in later films in the series, such as in Frankenstein Meets the Wolf Man (1943).

It was not until Son of Frankenstein (1939) that a character called "Ygor" first appears, here played by Bela Lugosi and revived by Lugosi in The Ghost of Frankenstein (1942) after his apparent murder in the earlier film. This character – a deranged blacksmith whose neck was broken and twisted due to a botched hanging – befriends the monster and later helps Dr. Wolf Frankenstein, leading to the "hunchbacked assistant" called "Igor" commonly associated with Frankenstein in popular culture. Regarding Son of Frankenstein, the film's director Rowland V. Lee said his crew let Lugosi "work on the characterization; the interpretation he gave us was imaginative and totally unexpected ... when we finished shooting, there was no doubt in anyone's mind that he stole the show. Karloff's monster was weak by comparison".

Cancelled remake
Guillermo del Toro had expressed interest in directing the reboot film for Universal. Del Toro said his Frankenstein would be a faithful "Miltonian tragedy", citing Frank Darabont's "near perfect" script, which evolved into Kenneth Branagh's Frankenstein. Del Toro said of his vision: "What I'm trying to do is take the myth and do something with it, but combining elements of Frankenstein and Bride of Frankenstein without making it just a classical myth of the monster. The best moments in my mind of Frankenstein, of the novel, are yet to be filmed [...] The only guy that has ever nailed for me the emptiness, not the tragic, not the Miltonian dimension of the monster, but the emptiness is Christopher Lee in the Hammer films, where he really looks like something obscenely alive. Boris Karloff has the tragedy element nailed down but there are so many versions, including that great screenplay by Frank Darabont that was ultimately not really filmed". He has also cited Bernie Wrightson's illustrations as inspiration, and said the film will not focus on the monster's creation, but be an adventure film featuring the character. Del Toro said he would like Wrightson to design his version of the creature. The film will also focus on the religious aspects of Shelley's tale. In June 2009, del Toro stated that production on Frankenstein was not likely to begin for at least four years. Despite this, he has already cast frequent collaborator Doug Jones in the role of Frankenstein's monster. In an interview with Sci Fi Wire, Jones stated that he learned of the news the same day as everybody else, that "Guillermo did say to the press that he's already cast me as his monster, but we've yet to talk about it. But in his mind, if that's what he's decided, then it's done ... It would be a dream come true". The film was to be a period piece.

Reboot
In June 2017, producer/director Alex Kurtzman revealed that Universal Studios was developing a new version of Frankenstein as an installment in its shared universe of classic movie monsters, to be known as the "Dark Universe". Javier Bardem was cast to portray the titular character. Although the idea of a shared universe was later shelved, following the failure of 2017's The Mummy at the box-office, Universal continued to move forward with reboots of its classic horror films. By November 2019, James Wan was announced to serve as producer on a reboot of the Frankenstein film series. Jason Blum expressed interest in joining the production in a producing role. In March 2020, Robbie Thompson was hired to serve as screenwriter, with the plot revolving around a group of teenagers who discover that a neighbor is creating a monster in their basement. The project will be a joint production between Universal Pictures and Wan's Atomic Monster Productions.

See also
 Boris Karloff filmography
 List of films featuring Frankenstein's monster
 Frankenstein in popular culture
 Gothic film – Notable films
 Pre-Code Hollywood
 Universal Classic Monsters
 1931 in science fiction

Notes

Sources

 Doherty, Thomas Patrick. Pre-Code Hollywood: Sex, Immorality, and Insurrection in American Cinema 1930–1934. New York: Columbia University Press 1999. 
 
 Vieira, Mark A., Sin in Soft Focus. New York: Harry N. Abrams, Inc. 2003.

Further reading

External links

 Frankenstein at AMC's Filmsite
 
 
 
 
 
 Frankenstein and The Bride of Frankenstein essay by Richard T. Jameson at National Film Registry
 Frankenstein essay by Daniel Eagan in America's Film Legacy: The Authoritative Guide to the Landmark Movies in the National Film Registry, A&C Black, 2010 , pages 187-188

1931 films
1931 horror films
1930s monster movies
1930s science fiction horror films
1930s English-language films
American black-and-white films
American films based on plays
American science fiction horror films
American monster movies
Articles containing video clips
Films about brain transplants
Censored films
Films based on adaptations
Films based on horror novels
Films directed by James Whale
Films set in the Alps
Films set in Bavaria
Films set in castles
Films set in Switzerland
Frankenstein (Universal film series)
Gothic horror films
United States National Film Registry films
Universal Pictures films
Obscenity controversies in film
Works banned in China
Films with screenplays by Garrett Fort
1930s American films
Films with screenplays by Francis Edward Faragoh
Films with screenplays by Robert Florey
Films with screenplays by John Russell (screenwriter)
Films with screenplays by Richard Schayer
Films based on works by Peggy Webling
Films based on works by John L. Balderston
Films produced by Carl Laemmle Jr.
Films scored by Bernhard Kaun